= Ethiopian HIV/AIDS Prevention and Control Office =

Government agency of Ethiopia

Ethiopian HIV/AIDS Prevention and Control Office was established in 2002, based in Addis Ababa, Ethiopia. It is an arm of the government agency with its own responsibility. It is a secretariat of the National AIDS Council (NAC), which was established in April 2000 and controlled by the government.

FHAPCO's goals include directing and coordinating the nation's HIV/AIDS policy's implementation. It is a national body tasked with organizing the nation's multisectoral response. Wider consultation with sector ministries, regional health bureaus, regional HAPCOs, civil society organizations, PLHIV associations and networks, the commercial sector, and bilateral and multilateral development partners are all part of it.
